Thomas Crosby (1840–1914) was an English missionary in Canada. 

Thomas Crosby may also refer to:

Thomas Crosby (Baptist) (1683–1751), English writer
Thomas F. Crosby Jr. (1940–2004), American judge
Thomas Crosby (Lord Mayor), Lord Mayor of London
Tom Crosby Jr. (1928–2011), American politician